Paul von Zielbauer is a journalist, writer, and social entrepreneur and public speaker. In 2008, he founded Roadmonkey Adventure Philanthropy, a for-profit social venture that combines challenging outdoor adventures with sustainable, hands-on volunteer projects for impoverished communities in Vietnam, Tanzania, Peru, Nicaragua and Argentina. From January 1999 to September 2009, Zielbauer was a staff reporter for The New York Times, reporting on the Iraq war and the U.S. military in 2006 and 2007.

Career 

Zielbauer founded Roadmonkey and coined the phrase "adventure philanthropy" in 2008, while still a reporter at The New York Times. Roadmonkey has been called "a new kind of travel" because of its intent to blend off-the-path adventure with hands-on volunteer projects that benefit people and communities in need. O: The Oprah Magazine, writing about Zielbauer, called him "a guy we like" because it said Roadmonkey seeks to "combine physically challenging expeditions with humanitarian efforts."

At The New York Times, Zielbauer worked primarily for the Metro desk, where he covered the New York City jail system and reported on the intersection or organized labor and organized crime. During periods in 2006 and 2007, he covered the war in Iraq and the aftermath of the September 2007 killings of civilians in Baghdad's Nisour Square by Blackwater military contractors. In 2007, Zielbauer became The Times' beat reporter on the military justice system, covering high-profile military prosecutions of alleged war crimes in Iraq and Afghanistan. Zielbauer's extensive coverage of the 2005 Haditha killings in Iraq generated criticism from some conservatives. 
 
From 2000 to 2003, Zielbauer was The Times' Connecticut bureau chief, covering politics and the state's lesser known corners.

Zielbauer's series on privatized prison medical care focused on the practices and performance of Prison Health Services Inc., the Tennessee company (now doing business as PHS Correctional Healthcare, a subsidiary of Corizon, Inc.) that provided care to jail inmates on Rikers Island.

Zielbauer began his journalism career in 1992 at the City News Bureau of Chicago, covering homicides, fires and, on the overnight shift, the Chicago Police Department. He left the wire service in late 1993 to embark on a 4-month, 1200-mile solo cycling trek from Hanoi to Ho Chi Minh City, Vietnam, where he wrote a front-page article for Crain's Chicago Business about American businesses in Vietnam preparing for the end of the U.S. economic embargo. From 1994 to 1995 Zielbauer was a staff reporter for the Orange County Register, covering Orange County's large immigrant Vietnamese community. While in graduate journalism school in New York City, Zielbauer worked part-time as a researcher for the Committee to Protect Journalists. From 1997 to 1998, he was the environment reporter for The Times-Union of Albany, NY, and wrote about pollution threats to the Hudson River.

Media and public appearances 
Zielbauer has appeared on CNN and National Public Radio to discuss his New York Times reporting. He and Roadmonkey Adventure Philanthropy have been featured by CNN, O: The Oprah Magazine, Outside magazine, ABC News, The Wall Street Journal, El Diario and other national publications.

Zielbauer frequently writes about self-leadership and has been a speaker at thought-leadership conferences including Summit Series and the KIN Global Conference.

Education and awards 
Upon graduating from Columbia University's Graduate School of Journalism with honors in 1996, Zielbauer was awarded a Fulbright Young Journalist scholarship to spend a year in Germany. Based in Berlin, he filed numerous articles for Newsday on European affairs, including the 1995 large-scale student-led protests in Belgrade, Serbia, against then-president Slobodan Milošević. Zielbauer received his Bachelor of Arts in English from Iowa State University in 1988.

For his 2005 investigative series on Prison Health Services Inc., Zielbauer won the New York State Associated Press award for Depth Reporting and World Hunger Year's annual Harry Chapin Award for reporting on poverty-related issues.

Early life 
Zielbauer grew up in Aurora, Ill., the first member of his German-Hungarian family born in the United States.

References 

People from Aurora, Illinois
Columbia University Graduate School of Journalism alumni
Iowa State University alumni
American people of German descent
American people of Hungarian descent
American male journalists
Living people
Journalists from Illinois
Year of birth missing (living people)